Rivkah (born November 13, 1981) is best known as the artist, writer, and creator of the ongoing teen graphic novel series Steady Beat.

Rivkah was born in Austin, Texas.  She began drawing comics full-time in August 2003.

Bibliography
Steady Beat - Follows the story of a young girl coming to terms with her older sister's homosexuality.
Volume 1 - October 2005
Volume 2 - October 2006
Mangaka America - Art and tutorial anthology with contributions from manga-influenced artists in America. October 2006
Pink - Runner-up in the international “Create Your Own Manga Contest” held by Manga Academy.

References

External links

 Artist's Homepage
 Artist's Blog
 Tokyopop page on Steady Beat

American female comics artists
20th-century American Jews
Writers from Austin, Texas
1981 births
Living people
Artists from Austin, Texas
21st-century American Jews
21st-century American women artists